Clapton, also known as Clapton-on-the-Hill, is a small village and civil parish in the district of Cotswold, in the county of Gloucestershire, England. In 2019 it had a population of 110.

History 
The name "Clapton" means 'Hill farm/settlement'.

References

External links

Villages in Gloucestershire
Civil parishes in Gloucestershire
Cotswold District